Grace Glowicki is a Canadian actress and filmmaker from Edmonton, Alberta. She is most noted for directing and starring in the 2019 film Tito, which was a shortlisted finalist for the John Dunning Best First Feature Award at the 9th Canadian Screen Awards in 2021.

An alumna of McGill University, Glowicki moved to Toronto, Ontario after graduation. She has acted in films including Hemorrhage,The Oxbow Cure, Her Friend Adam, Suck It Up, Cardinals, We Forgot to Break Up, Paper Year, Raf, Strawberry Mansion and Until Branches Bend, and in the web series Out with Dad and Carmilla. 

In 2016, she was named by the Toronto International Film Festival as one of its four "Rising Stars" of the year, alongside Jared Abrahamson, Mylène Mackay and Sophie Nélisse. She won a special jury award for best actress in a short film at the 2016 Sundance Film Festival for Her Friend Adam, and was a Vancouver Film Critics Circle nominee for Best Supporting Actress in a Canadian Film at the Vancouver Film Critics Circle Awards 2017, for her performance in Cardinals.

References

External links

21st-century Canadian actresses
21st-century Canadian screenwriters
21st-century Canadian women writers
Canadian film actresses
Canadian web series actresses
Canadian women screenwriters
Actresses from Edmonton
Writers from Edmonton
Film directors from Edmonton
McGill University alumni
Living people
Canadian Film Centre alumni
Year of birth missing (living people)